Bark.com is a web-based services marketplace headquartered in London that was founded in November 2014 by British entrepreneurs Andrew Michael and Kai Feller.

Description
Bark.com matches service buyers to suitable service providers. It allows people to book local service professionals.

History
Bark was founded in 2014 and launched in January 2015. It is privately funded by serial entrepreneur Andrew Michael.

In January 2015, it was announced that Bark had purchased Dublin-based skills marketplace SkillPages for an undisclosed sum.

In March 2015, English television presenter Nick Hewer became Bark's brand ambassador.

As of 2019, the service has 5m users across 5 markets and turned over £20m

In March 2020, the company launched in Singapore, New Zealand and Australia.

References

External links
Official website

Internet properties established in 2012
Online marketplaces of the United Kingdom
Employment social networks